Al Al-Sadah is a sub-district located in As Sawadiyah District, Al Bayda Governorate, Yemen. Al Al-Sadah had a population of 1515 according to the 2004 census.

References 

Sub-districts in As Sawadiyah District